A list of films produced by the Bollywood film industry based in Mumbai in 1926:

1926 in Indian cinema
106 films were produced in 1926. About 300 cinema theatres existed all over India by 1926, along with several "travelling bio-scopes". According to Amitabh Bachchan in his article for the Hindustan Times "90% of the films shown were imported from Hollywood, almost exclusively from Universal Studios". 
Fatma Begum became the first woman director of Indian cinema when she produced and directed Bulbule Paristan.
The first cinema trade organisation called The Bombay Cinema and Theatre Trade Organisation was formed in India in 1926.
Films had their "main title" in English followed by the regional Indian language title.
Sulochana (Ruby Myers), made her debut with The Telephone Girl and became one of the popular stars of 1920s and early 1930s. 
Kanan Devi also called Kanan Bala, started her acting career at the age of ten in the film Joydev directed by Jyotish Bannerji for Jyoti Studios. She went on to become one of the early singer-actor of Hindi and Bengali cinema.
Zebunissa, known also as Zebu, started her acting career with Royal Art Studio in 1926, and remained with the company until it closed down around 1940.

Films
Bulbule Paristan was the first Indian cinema film to be directed by a woman director Fatma Begum. The film was produced under her recently formed Fatma Films and starred herself and her three daughters Zubeida, Sultana and Shahzadi.
The Telephone Girl  was noted as a film that made "Pioneering use of real locations", It was directed by Homi Master for Kohinoor Film Company and was the debut film of real-life telephone operator, Sulochana (Ruby Myers).
Typist Girl was directed by Chandulal Shah for the Kohinoor Film Company and starred Sulochana, Raja Sandow and Gohar. A social film, it was commercially as successful as the mythology films produced at that time.
The Vamp directed by Naval Gandhi for Sharda Film Company and starring Miss Yakbal has been cited as a "Modern Girl" film along with The Telephone Girl.

Film Companies 
Imperial Film Company founded by Ardeshir Irani, who was to later make the first Talkie film Alam Ara (1931).
Fatma Films was founded by Fatma Begum and the name later changed in 1928 to Victoria-Fatma Films. 
Punjab Film Corporation was set up in Lahore.

A-C

D-J

K-M

N-S

T-Z

References

External links
Bollywood films of 1926 at IMDb

1926
Bollywood
Films, Bollywood